The 2008–09 Azerbaijan First Division  is the second-level of football in Azerbaijan. The season started on 6 September 2009 with eight teams participating in the league. NBC Salyan were the defending champions.

ABN Bärdä won the league, with Shahdag finishing as runners up. Both teams were due to be promoted to the Azerbaijan Premier League, but due to the AFFA's license policy, neither teams were.

Schedule
Each team played each other four times, twice at home and twice away, with the season started on 6 September 2008 and finished on 16 May 2009. There were no games between 7 December 2008 and 15 February 2009, due to the annual winter break.

Teams

Stadia and locations
Note: Table lists in alphabetical order.

League table

Top goalscorers
Last updated: 17 May 2009; Source: www.football-plus.az 
15 goals
 Vasif Aliyev (ANSAD-Petrol) Zahid Talibov (FK Shahdag)14 goals
 Bahruz Ismayilov (Qafqaz University FK)''

See also
 2008–09 Azerbaijan Premier League
 2008–09 Azerbaijan Cup

References

External links
 pfl.az
  AFFA

Azerbaijan First Division seasons
2008–09 in Azerbaijani football
Azer